The Disaster Area is a collection of science fiction short stories by British author J. G. Ballard.

Contents
"Storm-bird, Storm-dreamer"
"The Concentration City"
"The Subliminal Man"
"Now Wakes the Sea"
"Minus One"
"Mr F. is Mr F."
"Zone of Terror"
"Manhole 69"
"The Impossible Man"

Sources

External links

The Terminal Collection: JG Ballard First Editions

1967 short story collections
Short story collections by J. G. Ballard
Jonathan Cape books